Bağlarbaşı, historically Mazmahor, is a village in the Şahinbey District, Gaziantep Province, Turkey. The village had a population of  779 in 2022.

References

Villages in Şahinbey District